John William Wilkinson (20 April 1892–3 August 1967) was an English first-class cricketer who played in one match for Worcestershire against Lancashire at Dudley in 1927.

Notes

References
John Wilkinson from CricketArchive

English cricketers
Worcestershire cricketers
1892 births
1967 deaths